Perfume de Gardênia (Perfume of Gardenia) is a 1992 Brazilian-Argentine drama film directed by Guilherme de Almeida Prado. It was screened at the 1992 Montreal World Film Festival. The filming took place in April 1991, with its production lasting until February 1992.

Synopsis

Daniel is a taxi driver, he works the night to pay the car payments, is married to a housewife Adalgisa and have a son. By chance, she starts making pornochanchada films, abandons the family and is prohibited by Daniel to see Joaquim. For eleven years, Daniel nurtures a sense of revenge, which gains strength when Joaquim, as an adult, finds his mother in full decay professional.

Cast

Christiane Torloni as Adalgisa 
José Mayer as Daniel 
Marcelo Ribeiro as Joaquim (as a child)
Walter Quiroz as Joaquim (as an adult)
Cláudio Marzo as delegate
Betty Faria as Odete Vargas 
José Lewgoy as Ody Marques 
Raul Gazolla as César Lamas 
Helena Ignez
Oscar Magrini  
Sérgio Mamberti 
Matilde Mastrangi
Paulo Villaça

Awards and nominations

Festival de Brasília 1992 (Brazil)
 Won the categories of best actor (José Mayer), best supporting character actor (José Lewgoy) and best supporting character actress (Betty Faria).

Festival de Gramado 1992 (Brazil)
 Nominated for best film.

References

External links

1992 drama films
1992 films
Brazilian drama films
Films about actors
Films directed by Guilherme de Almeida Prado
Films shot in São Paulo